Antonito is a Statutory Town located in Conejos County, Colorado, United States. The town population was 647 at the 2020 United States Census.

History

Antonito began life as a sheep herding camp known as San Antonio Junction, referring to its proximity to the Conejos and San Antonio rivers. When the Denver & Rio Grande Railroad built its line south from Alamosa, the town was renamed Antonito and became an important town on the railroad line. The town was incorporated in 1889. There are currently no major industries located in Antonito, but the historic Cumbres & Toltec Scenic Railroad has one terminus in Antonito and the other in Chama, New Mexico. The C&TS also has maintenance facilities and rail yard in the town.

The area's economy has recently experienced an upsurge with the passage of Colorado's recreational marijuana laws. A 420-friendly town, several recreational marijuana dispensaries have opened within the city limits. Additionally, between summer 2015 and early 2016, 10 new businesses, some marijuana-related and some not, opened their doors to customers in the area.

In 2015, a Colorado State Highway project rebuilt the stretch of Highway 285 that runs through town. The new highway has helped beautify the downtown area and improve traffic flow.

The city has a number of unique buildings, including a historic Denver & Rio Grande Western Railroad depot, one of only a few lava rock depots still existing in the United States. Currently in a state of disrepair, a grant to restore the building is in the works. Cano's Castle, a folk-art home constructed by a local resident, attracts attention from tourists and local residents alike. Just south of town, Colorado Parks and Wildlife and Conejos County have jointly developed an outdoor shooting range with areas for rifle sighting as well as target practice ranges for various types of rifles and handguns. An indoor archery range and nearby hunting and fishing opportunities attract outdoor enthusiasts.

A library, tire repair shop and a new medical clinic have opened in recent years and Family Dollar recently built a store in Antonito. The South Conejos Jr. and Sr. High School was recently built.

The town is known for its many murals, most of them painted by Fred Haberlein.

Antonito is the location of the oldest church building and congregation in Colorado, Our Lady of Guadalupe Catholic Church, built in 1857.

Following the legalization of Cannabis in Colorado, Antonito took advantage of its location along the New Mexico border (where cannabis was illegal until 2022) to become a destination for New Mexico residents seeking to legally purchase cannabis. The tax revenue has resulted in a $295,000 annual increase to the city budget.

Geography
Antonito is located in the San Luis Valley near the southern border of Colorado at  (37.077, -106.010), along U.S. Highway 285.

Antonito is the southern terminus of the San Luis and Rio Grande Railroad and the eastern terminus of the steam powered, narrow gauge Cumbres & Toltec Scenic Railroad, which runs westwards to Osier, Colorado, and Chama, New Mexico.

Demographics

At the 2000 census, there were 873 people, 357 households and 234 families residing in the town. The racial makeup of the town was 61.40% White, 0.11% African American, 3.55% Native American, 0.23% Asian, 31.96% from other races, and 2.75% from two or more races. Hispanic or Latino of any race were 90.26% of the population.

There were 357 households, of which 33.9% had children under the age of 18 living with them, 37.8% were married couples living together, 20.4% had a female householder with no husband present, and 34.2% were non-families. 31.9% of all households were made up of individuals, and 16.5% had someone living alone who was 65 years of age or older. The average household size was 2.45 and the average family size was 3.09.

28.8% of the population were under the age of 18, 8.4% from 18 to 24, 23.1% from 25 to 44, 21.4% from 45 to 64, and 18.3% who were 65 years of age or older. The median age was 36 years. For every 100 females, there were 98.9 males. For every 100 females age 18 and over, there were 91.4 males.

The median household income was $19,205 and the median family income was $23,162. Males had a median income of $25,417 compared with $17,500 for females. The per capita income for the town was $10,047. About 26.4% of families and 29.6% of the population were below the poverty line, including 36.3% of those under age 18 and 22.5% of those age 65 or over.

Notable people
 Carlos F. Lucero, judge of the United States Court of Appeals for the Tenth Circuit
 Joe Mondragon, jazz musician

See also

Colorado
Bibliography of Colorado
Index of Colorado-related articles
Outline of Colorado
List of counties in Colorado
List of municipalities in Colorado
List of places in Colorado
Cumbres & Toltec Scenic Railroad
San Luis Valley

References

External links

Town of Antonito website
CDOT map of the Town of Antonito

Towns in Conejos County, Colorado
Towns in Colorado